Simple Pleasure is an album by Eastern Rebellion, led by pianist Cedar Walton, recorded in 1992 and released by the MusicMasters label.

Track listing
All compositions by Cedar Walton except where noted
 "In the Kitchen" – 5:29
 "Roni's Decision" – 7:18
 "Dear Ruth" – 6:35
 "Simple Pleasure" – 6:09
 "Sixth Avenue" – 5:23
 "My Ideal" (Leo Robin, Newell Chase, Richard A. Whiting) – 7:17
 "All The Things You Are" (Jerome Kern, Oscar Hammerstein II) – 6:23
 "My Man's Gone Now" (George Gershwin, DuBose Heyward) – 7:02
 "Theme for Ernie" (Fred Lacey) – 4:30

Personnel 
Cedar Walton – piano
Ralph Moore – tenor saxophone
David Williams – bass
Billy Higgins – drums

References 

1993 albums
Eastern Rebellion albums
MusicMasters Records albums